In Slavic mythology (in particular Ukrainian, Czech and Slovak), the Raróg or Raroh is a fire demon, often depicted as a fiery falcon.

According to Czech folklore, a raroh can hatch from an egg that was incubated on a stove for nine days and nights, and can appear either as a fiery falcon or a dragon. In Polish folklore, the rarog is a tiny bird that can be held in a pocket, and can bring people happiness.

A caldera on Jupiter's moon Io was named Rarog Patera, a massive eruption from which was recorded by the W. M. Keck Observatory and Japan's HISAKI (SPRINT-A) spacecraft on August 15, 2013.

The northern cardinal-shaped logo of the Polish video game company CD Projekt is called the Raróg.

See also
Hierofalco
Bennu, Egyptian firebird
Firebird (Slavic folklore) (Жар-Птица)
Huma (mythology), Persian firebird
Phoenix (mythology), sacred firebird found in the mythologies of many cultures
Simurgh
Slavic mythology
Svarog

References

Slavic legendary creatures
Legendary birds